Ultimate I Spy is a 2008 video game developed by British studio Gusto Games and published by Scholastic Interactive for the Wii home console. The game is based on the books. The game combines aspects of party video games and adventure games and is aimed at 4 to 7 year olds.

Gameplay
Players control a magnifying glass and search scenes through 10 different educationally themed areas, either in single-player or two-player mode. There are 40 different riddles in the game, 4 in each of the 10 maps. Players are able to play minigames in the riddles, such as throwing darts and juggling.

References

Video games based on novels
2008 video games
Puzzle video games
Video games developed in the United Kingdom
Wii-only games
Wii games